Sir Thomas Somerset DL (14 December 1870 – 16 June 1947) was an industrialist and Ulster Unionist Member of Parliament (MP) for North Belfast from 1929 to 1945.

Life and career
The son of James Somerset, an engineer, he was educated at Largymore, County Down. He established Thomas Somerset and Co. Ltd., linen manufacturers in 1891. This enterprise proved profitable, with factories at Belfast, Greyabbey and Portaferry, giving employment to about 1500 people. He was also a director of Commercial Insurance Co. of Ireland, Ltd., and Chairman of the Northern Counties Committee of the London, Midland and Scottish Railway.

Somerset was elected MP for North Belfast in 1929, holding his seat to 1945. He was knighted in 1936.

Family
Somerset married Ethel Parker of Cheshire and had two children, a son and daughter. The Somersets lived at The Weir, Upper Malone Road, Belfast.

References

Notes

External links 
 

1870 births
1947 deaths
Members of the Parliament of the United Kingdom for Belfast constituencies (since 1922)
UK MPs 1929–1931
UK MPs 1931–1935
UK MPs 1935–1945
Ulster Unionist Party members of the House of Commons of the United Kingdom
Knights Bachelor